Corpus Christi is a coastal city in the South Texas region of the U.S. state of Texas.  The county seat of Nueces County, it also extends into Aransas, Kleberg, and San Patricio counties. The population was 277,454 at the 2000 census; in 2006 the U.S. Census Bureau estimated the city's population at 285,175, making it the eighth-largest city in the state. It is the principal city of the three-county Corpus Christi Metropolitan Statistical Area as well as the larger Corpus Christi-Kingsville Combined Statistical Area. The translation from Latin of the city's name is Body of Christ, given to the settlement by the Spanish, in honor of the Blessed Sacrament (Eucharist). The city has been nicknamed The Sparkling City by the Sea, or "Corpitos" particularly in literature promoting tourism.

Before Corpus Christi was known as Kinney's Rancho or Kinney's Ranch it was on a site known as the Old Indian Trading Grounds where traders smuggled contraband goods to sell and trade in Mexico as early as 1829.

Texas Revolution and Mexican–American War
Corpus Christi was founded in 1839 by Colonel Henry Lawrence Kinney as Kinney's Trading Post, or Kinney's Ranch, a small trading post to sell supplies to a Mexican revolutionary army camped about 25 miles west, just three years after Texas declared independence from Mexico but the post was located in the disputed territory south of the Nueces River.
In July 1845, U.S. troops under General Zachary Taylor set up camp there in preparation for war with Mexico, where they remained until March 1846, when they marched south to the Rio Grande to enforce it as the southern border of the United States.

Civil War
On February 23, 1861, in a statewide vote on secession, the vote in Corpus Christi was 87 for secession and 40 against, which brought the total vote in Nueces County to 164 for and 42 against. There were many Union sympathizers in the city. Some originally came from the North and some were veterans of the Mexican War.

In the second week of August 1862, five Union warships under the command of Lt. J.W. Kittredge sailed into Corpus Christi Bay and bombarded the city. Stores and houses below the bluff made easy targets for Kittredge's guns.
The bombardment did considerable damage to the town. Many of the residents had evacuated before the battle. After it was over, people began to return to town. The Confederates, provoked by the attack, then began to take revenge by plundering the homes and property of known Union supporters.

Port of Corpus Christi
The port of Corpus Christi opened in 1925 after culminating efforts that began as early as 1848 to obtain a deep-water port.
The Port of Corpus Christi currently is the sixth largest U.S. port and deepest inshore port on the Gulf of Mexico, it handles mostly oil and agricultural products. In 2005 it was ranked as the 47th largest in the world by cargo tonnage.

Natural disasters

Hurricanes
Corpus Christi has been affected by many hurricanes and tropical storms.
1916 Texas hurricane
1919 Florida Keys hurricane
Hurricane Carla (1961)
Hurricane Beulah (1967)
Hurricane Celia (1970)
Tropical Storm Amelia (1978)
Hurricane Allen (1980)
Hurricane Bret (1999)
Hurricane Harvey (2017)
Hurricane Hanna (2020)

Timeline

See also
 Timelines of other cities in the South Texas area of Texas: Brownsville, Laredo, McAllen, San Antonio

References

Further reading

 
 Lessoff, Alan. Where Texas Meets the Sea: Corpus Christi and Its History (University of Texas Press, 2015) 360 pp.